Claudia Ruggerini (also known as Marisa; 1 February 1922, Milan - 4 June 2016, Rome) was an Italian partisan, activist, doctor, and neuropsychiatrist. During World War II, she joined the Italian Communist Party to overthrow the government of Benito Mussolini in July 1943.

Early life and family
Claudia Ruggerini was an Italian neuropsychiatrist, partisan, activist, and physician born in Milan, the former Italian Kingdom, in 1922. Claudia was born into a poor family in Via Padova 36, which was a street of immigrants in the 1920s. Her family was from Brianza. 
Her mother worked as a masseuse and later as a free trader, while her grandmother was a foundling. The women in Claudia’s childhood are what drove and inspired her. Later in life, Claudia always credited her mother’s work ethic and intelligence while looking back on her past academic and professional opportunities. Claudia’s father was a part of the Italian Communist Party. 
Her father was beaten to death in 1934 by a fascists patrol in front of his house when Claudia was just twelve years old. Claudia watched her father from the window as he was horrifically beaten and left for dead.

She referred to herself as “a nerd,” as she was incredibly studious and had a love for the arts. This love for the arts is what precipitated her determination to bring awareness to anti-fascism. In Venice, where her Mother went to massage rich clients, Claudia went to churches, to the Biennale of art, and to see films of the film festival, which could not circulate in the fascist and provincial Italy. Claudia’s rebellious nature could be seen in her character since early childhood. In Kindergarten, Claudia’s teachers discovered that she was left-handed, a calamity that, at the time, needed to be “corrected.” While the teachers succeeded in retraining Claudia to use her right hand, this encounter seemed to awaken the “rebel” in her. Her rebellious, witty nature is what eventually propelled her to join the Milanese anti-fascist resistance against Benito Mussolini

Education
When Claudia started high school, a teacher directed her to the humanities, and in one session, she obtained her teaching diploma in classical studies. Afterwards, Claudia began her studies at University of Industrial Chemistry, then switching her focal point to medicine in 1942. When at the university, she met Hans, who was her "sweetheart", and (as she would only discover after the war) had emigrated from Vienna because he was a Jew. Claudia then joined the Garibaldi Brigade, the fifth column on behalf of the CLN inside San Vittore. Hans, in fact, had been locked up there, and through a fortuitous series of events, Claudia won the trust of the Germans who ran the prison. She stated "I was living in fear." Despite the fear, she did not give up, risking the worst.
Upon studying medicine, Claudia met several anti-fascist students. In July 1943, Claudia met the leader of the Neapolitan Communist Party Antonio D'Ambrosio, one of the most respected and popular leaders of the Milanese resistance, and alongside her fellow anti-fascist peers, Claudia diligently began to fight for the cause, clearly inspired by the horrific death of her father. She was the only woman in the initiative committee, among intellectuals that the Communist D'Ambrosio, a member of the CLN (Committee for National Liberation), had set up.

Contributions and Communist Party activism 
Claudia joined the clandestine Communist Party of Naples. She surrounded herself with like minded young people, joining a group of artists, writers, and journalists, great architects, painters, sculptors, poets, and art critics who inspired one another through meetings to encourage passion and creativity, harbingers of new culture, and planning. Above all, the group pushed one another to never give up hope on fighting for the cause. Her peers played an important role as a source of training and cultural enrichment. Many of these great minds would become close friends of Claudia’s that stuck by her throughout her lifetime, as they met throughout the Resistance and continued to inspire each other. In 1953, Claudia went as part of a delegation to visit Picasso, to convince him, which she did successfully, to grant the first major exhibition of his work held in Milan. Claudia accepted the incredibly risky tasks of underground press distribution and the delivery of weapons to the partisans of Valdossola. She was a great risk taker and extremely proactive in the Resistance, acting fearlessly by distributing underground press materials, passing messages by bicycle, delivering weapons, and stealing valuable anti-fascist intelligence from the Prison of San Vittore.

Post-fascist regime 
After the fascist regime ended in Italy on April 25, 1945, the resistance declared a long-awaited victory, while Claudia and friends entered Milan’s newsroom to memorialize the liberation of the major media.  Claudia knew Vittorini well, became a friend of Alfonso Gatto, and with them she occupied the editorial office of Corriere della Sera on April 25, to bring out the first issue of the no longer fascist newspaper. "The last political mission," Claudia said, "I made it in '53. When we went to Picasso's Cote d'Azur with D'Ambrosio and Reale, to convince him to lend Guernica to Milan for the exhibition they were dedicating to him in the Palazzo Reale. At a certain moment, Jean Cocteau also arrived. It was a wonderful day"
This brand new, “free” edition of the Evening Courier was published that same day.
The main ideals of the Resistance were the conquest of liberty, the defeat of the fascists, and the expulsion of the Germans, which were achieved. With liberation and victory assured, Claudia continued her clinical schooling, concentrating on psychoanalytic treatment in children and neuropsychiatry, as she completed her thesis entitled “The Technique of Psychoanalytic Treatment in Childhood”(1949). Soon after, she met Professor Bruno Noll, who later became her husband. Afterwards, Claudia enrolled at the University of Pavia, with a specialty in Neuropsychiatry, then finishing her course of study in 1952. Claudia expressed wanting to make her contribution towards the renewal of society, as she engaged exclusively in the Public Institutions of Health. Working as a Consultant Neurologist in Milan, she worked her way up in neurology for 33 years, earning the title of Chief Neurologist at the hospital Passirana Rho in Milan.

Later academic accomplishments 
Claudia became notable for her work with children, as she formulated and encouraged the revolutionary opinion that children with mental or neurological disorders could be integrated effectively into normal schools. In a 2016 interview, Claudia reflected on her experiences with children during that time. “In the clinic I was alone with the child and his relatives (even the nurse came out), I took off the white coat (always a source of fright), placed on the carpet a large box of toys and watched the child choose and play. Then I visited. Often such children were sent to ‘special schools’, which only enrolled patients with neurological or mental disorders. These were not appropriate schools for children who had an educational or cultural problem! We undertook great fights with some school principals to get the "non-pathological" children integrated into normal schools, yet we obtained excellent results.” Upon her retirement in 1987, Claudia was awarded the title of “Emeritus Chief of Neurology,” and continued her work at the hospital as a volunteer for ten years. She continuously stated her belief that the profession was to be a “service” to the community.

End of life contributions and activism 
Claudia felt a personal commitment to serve her community, forever grateful for the opportunities afforded her and humbled by the experience of living under fascism. In 1988, Claudia and her friend Anna Mancini organized a non-profit known as the “Treviso Advar Foundation,” providing at-home care for terminally ill cancer patients, alongside nursing and medical teams, in addition to training of volunteers. The organization created a warm and welcoming “hospice” house with cultural activities for everyone, including the patients. Claudia knew how it felt to be oppressed and to lack freedom, hence why she continued her activism throughout generations. When asked, late in her life, about her role as a freedom fighter, she said, “I know very well what it means not to have freedom (of opinion, of the press, of religion, of movement, etc.), to conquer it and to respect it. It is different for the new generations, who often confuse freedom with license. It is up to adults, even the media, to educate!” Her life was truly one of great sacrifice, risk, determination, love, and kindness. 
Claudia Ruggerini passed away peacefully from natural causes in Rome, Italy, on July 4, 2016.

References 

1922 births
2016 deaths
Italian resistance movement members
Italian anti-fascists
Italian psychiatrists
Female anti-fascists